Ernst Engel (26 March 18218 December 1896) was a German statistician and economist, famous for the Engel curve and Engel's law.

Biography
Ernst was born in Dresden in 1821. He studied at the Freiberg University of Mining and Technology in Saxony, and on completing his curriculum traveled in Germany and France.

Immediately after the revolution of 1848, Engel was attached to the royal commission in Saxony appointed to determine the relations between trade and labor. In 1850, he was directed by the government to assist in the organization of the German Industrial Exhibition of Leipzig (the first of its kind). His efforts were so successful that, in 1854, he was induced to enter the government service, as chief of the newly instituted statistical department. He retired, however, from the office in 1858. He founded at Dresden the first Mortgage Insurance Society (Hypotheken-Versicherungsgesellschaft), and as a result of the success of his work, was summoned in 1860 to Berlin as director of the statistical department, in succession to Karl Friedrich Wilhelm Dieterici. In his new office, he made himself a name of worldwide reputation. Raised to the rank of Geheimer Regierungsrat, he retired in 1882 and lived henceforward in Serkowitz, today part of Radebeul near Dresden, where he died in 1896. His investigations into the social condition of the working classes were much noted.

Works
Engel was a voluminous writer on the subjects with which his name is connected, but his statistical papers are mostly published in the periodicals which he himself established, namely, Preuss. Statistik (in 1861); Zeitschrift des Königlichen Preußischen Statistischen Bureaus, and Zeitschrift des Statistischen Bureaus des Königreichs Sachsen.
Among his works were Die Methoden der Volkszählung ("Census methods," 1861), Die Volkszählungen, ihre Stellung zur Wissenschaft und ihre Aufgabe in der Geschichte ("Censuses, their place in science and role in history," 1862), Land und Leute des Preussischen Staates ("The Prussian land and people," 1863), and Das Zeitalter des Dampfes ("The era of steam," 1881).

References

Further reading
 Heinrich Strecker, Rolf Wiegert (1997) "Engel, (Christian Lorenz) Ernst," pp. 280–3 in Leading Personalities in Statistical Sciences from the Seventeenth Century to the Present (ed. N. L. Johnson and S. Kotz) New York: Wiley. Originally published in Encyclopedia of Statistical Science.

External links
Photograph of Engel on Portraits of Statisticians
 

1821 births
1896 deaths
German economists
German statisticians
Members of the Prussian House of Representatives
Scientists from Dresden
People from the Kingdom of Saxony
Freiberg University of Mining and Technology alumni